Cô Tô is a small rural district of Quảng Ninh province in the northeastern region of Vietnam. As of 2009 the district had a population of 4,985, is the lowest population district in Quảng Ninh. The district covers an area of 47.3 km². The district capital lies at Cô Tô.

Administrative divisions
2 communes: Thanh Lân, Đồng Tiến and 1 town: Cô Tô.

References

Districts of Quảng Ninh province